Antwan Tamon Mims (born February 14, 1978) is an American criminal who was added to the FBI Ten Most Wanted Fugitives list on June 27, 2018. Mims was captured on July 31, 2018. It took only 3 hours to find him guilty and he was sentenced to life in prison in March 2019.

Background
Mims was wanted for the March 25, 2018, murders of Cortez Lamont Miller and Michael Canthrell Johnson while they were attending a house party in Benton Harbor, Michigan. Mims is a known member of the Gangster Disciples Street Gang.

In December 2005, charges related to the March 26, 2005, triple murders of Rodney Stevens, 30, Juwan Stevens, 12, and Ursulla Allen, 33, in Benton Harbor, Michigan, were dismissed without prejudice by the Berrien County Prosecutor when Mims was charged with federal narcotic crimes. Mim's codefendants Andrew Miller Jr, and Corey McCall received mandatory life sentences with no chance of parole for their involvement in those murders. It is not clear why Berrien County did not pursue the 2005 charges, which if Mims had been convicted of either 1st Degree Murder, or Felony Homicide would have resulted in life in prison with no chance of parole, in 2005, and not free to commit the March 25, 2018, homicides.

References

1978 births
2018 murders in the United States
American people convicted of murder
FBI Ten Most Wanted Fugitives
Fugitives
Living people